The Memphis Fever Germs were a minor league baseball team from Memphis, Tennessee, that played in the Class B Southern League in 1893.

References 

Southern League (1885–1899) teams
Baseball teams established in 1893
Sports clubs disestablished in 1893
F
Professional baseball teams in Tennessee
1893 establishments in Tennessee
1893 disestablishments in Tennessee
Defunct baseball teams in Tennessee
Baseball teams disestablished in 1893